Pitt–Greenville Airport  is a public airport located two miles (3 km) north of the central business district of Greenville, North Carolina and East Carolina University. It is mostly used for general aviation but is also served by American Airlines, which operates commuter service to Charlotte. The airport manager is Kim W. Hopper.

History

The Works Progress Administration constructed the Greenville Airport in 1940 on land that was jointly owned by the city of Greenville and Pitt County.  A Civil Pilot Training Program operated from the airport until it was leased by the United States Navy on May 1, 1942, to be an outlying field of Marine Corps Air Station Cherry Point.  The field was underutilized until November 30, 1942, when it was announced that it would be upgraded by the Civil Aeronautics Administration.

The first Marine Corps flying squadrons to arrive were scout bombing squadrons VMSB-343 and VMSB-344 in January 1944. July saw the arrival of fighter squadrons VMF-913 and VMF-914 and October brought the photo reconnaissance squadrons VMD-354 and  VMD-954. During the war, Outlying Field Greenville was the busiest of MCAS Cherry Point's outlying fields. PGV used to service Delta Airlines to Atlanta

2011 Expansion
The airport officially opened the renovated air terminal on February 24, 2011.  The $7.9 million expansion was funded by the federal stimulus.  It took two years of planning and 18 months of construction.

Runway expansion and safety improvements
The Airport Authority decided to extend Runway 2/20 by 670 feet.  It will receive $2.5 million from the FAA to help buy out the affected houses.  The groundbreaking occurred in August 2013, and was completed in 2014.   The lengthening will allow the current critical aircraft to operate at full payload service capabilities, including during hot weather. For years, Pitt-Greenville had been hampered by its short runways. Teams playing games against East Carolina University had to fly into nearby Kinston because the runways were not long enough to handle modern charter jets.

This expansion will also bring this runway up to current runway safety area standards.  Also included will be the clearing of tree obstacles and the installation of a new GPS RNAV vertically-guided approaches for Runway 2.

Airline and destination

Passenger

Top destinations (November 2021 - October 2022)

References

Books

External links
 Pitt–Greenville Airport, official site
  at North Carolina DOT airport guide
 
 

Airports in North Carolina
Works Progress Administration in North Carolina
Transportation in Pitt County, North Carolina
Buildings and structures in Pitt County, North Carolina